Leovigildo Xiqués Lugo (September 23, 1917 – ?), also known as "Leo Lugo", was a Cuban outfielder in the Negro leagues in the 1940s.

A native of Havana, Cuba, Xiqués made his Negro leagues debut in 1944 with the Indianapolis Clowns, and played with the Clowns through 1947.

References

External links
 and Baseball-Reference Black Baseball stats and Seamheads

1917 births
1999 deaths
Indianapolis Clowns players
Baseball outfielders
Cuban expatriate baseball players in the United States
Baseball players from Havana
Year of death uncertain